USS Manchester (LCS-14) is an  in the United States Navy. She is the second ship to be named for Manchester, New Hampshire.

Design
In 2002, the United States Navy initiated a program to develop the first of a fleet of littoral combat ships. The Navy initially ordered two trimaran hulled ships from General Dynamics, which became known as the  after the first ship of the class, . Even-numbered U.S. Navy littoral combat ships are built using the Independence-class trimaran design, while odd-numbered ships are based on a competing design, the conventional monohull . The initial order of littoral combat ships involved a total of four ships, including two of the Independence-class design. On 29 December 2010, the Navy announced that it was awarding Austal USA a contract to build ten additional Independence-class littoral combat ships.

Construction and career 
The ship's keel was laid on 29 June 2015, at Mobile, Alabama. The initials of New Hampshire senator Jeanne Shaheen, the ship's sponsor, were welded into the hull of Manchester during the traditional keel laying ceremony. Manchester was christened on 7 May 2016 and she was launched on 12 May 2016. Manchester was commissioned on 26 May 2018.

She is assigned to Littoral Combat Ship Squadron One.

References

External links

 Ship's website
 

Independence-class littoral combat ships